Sandblast Rally is a rally racing event for both cars and motorcycles.  The event takes place in the towns of Chesterfield, Cheraw and Patrick, South Carolina, USA.  Recently, the events have been held February of each year.  The 2008 event was the largest rally in the United States.

Unusual Attributes

The rally takes place within the Sand Hills State Forest, part of the Sandhills region of the Carolinas. Traditionally, rallies take place on closed tarmac or gravel roads. Sandblast rally roads are almost entirely sand. Some of the roads are compacted by heavy trucks, some of the more infrequently used roads are quite soft. This presents an unusual challenge to rally cars, as the constant drag of the sand increases the wear and drag on the transmissions. The driving technique is also different from other rallies, as the soft sand on the side of the road can be similar to a snowbank, while the braking ability exceeds that of tarmac with slick tires.

History

Long named “Sandhills Sandblast” after the region, the event was first organized by Greg Healey in the early nineties. In only the second year of running, the event was tapped to become part of the SCCA ProRally national championship. Healey moved north to Pennsylvania in the mid-nineties and the rally lay dormant for several years. These first rallies differed from the current setup in that they started at noon and ran well into the night, using three or four stages run in complete darkness.

In 2001 Charles Sherrill resurrected the event and ran similar stages as before. One of the busiest years was 2003 when the event ran twice in one year, spring and fall. The fall event was the first event sanctioned by the newly formed NASA Rally Sport organization.

The summer of 2005 saw Sherrill looking west and thinking of starting another rally. Thus the reigns of the rally were passed to the current organizer, Anders Green. The official rally name was simplified to “Sandblast Rally” at that time.

The February 2007 event saw the introduction of motorcycles as part of NASA Rally Sport's new RallyMoto program.

Past winners

References

External links
Official Sandblast Rally web page
Event organizing group Lina Racing
The Sandblast Rally experience with an open light car 

Rally competitions in the United States
Motorsport in South Carolina
Tourist attractions in Chesterfield County, South Carolina